Happy Tiger Records was an independent American record label that was owned by the Flying Tiger Line air freight company. Happy Tiger operated from 1969 to 1971. During this time the label produced more than two dozen albums by Count Basie, Mason Proffit, Red Rhodes, Priscilla Paris, Paul Kelly, and the Anita Kerr Singers. They released two albums by the post-Van Morrison Them band.

History
Happy Tiger's offices were located at 1801 Avenue of the Stars in Century City, Los Angeles, California. The staff included engineer and producer Ray Ruff, who had previously worked for ABC-Paramount Records. During its short existence Happy Tiger issued twenty-seven albums and numerous singles, all distributed by Era Records. The label also issued eight albums of oldies under the joint Happy Tiger/Era label, including works by Phil Baugh, Dorsey Burnette and some early Beach Boys recordings.  They also recorded singles by such veteran performers as Kay Starr, Roberta Sherwood and Joanie Sommers. By the end of October 1971, Happy Tiger's national promo chief, Dave Chackler had left to join up to Ray Ruff's record label Oak as its vice-president and man in charge of promotion merchandising. Happy Tiger's final album in 1971 was Mason Proffit's Movin' Toward Happiness. The label's final single in 1972 was Richard Berry performing a song he had written and that the Kingsmen had made famous in 1963, "Louie Louie." After Happy Tiger folded, Warner Bros. Records reissued Paul Kelly's Stealin' in the Name of the Lord in 1972, retitled Dirt. Warner also reissued the two Mason Proffit albums as a double LP, Come and Gone, in 1974.

Notable artists
Count Basie
Richard Berry
Donnie Brooks
Gib Guilbeau
Paul Kelly
Anita Kerr Singers
Baker Knight
Priscilla Paris
Keith Green
Dan Penn
Mason Proffit
Red Rhodes
Roberta Sherwood
Joanie Sommers
Kay Starr
Them

Discography

See also
Era Records
List of record labels

References

American independent record labels
Defunct record labels of the United States
Record labels established in 1969
Record labels disestablished in 1971